Fred Hemmes Jr. (born 28 January 1981) is a former professional tennis player from the Netherlands and coach of Kim Clijsters from 2020 to 2022. He is the son of Fred Hemmes Sr., a tennis player who competed at Wimbledon.

Career
Hemmes played mostly on the Challenger circuit, where he won six doubles titles.

The Dutchman had a win over Andrei Pavel, a former top 20 player, to qualify for the 2004 Heineken Open. He then defeated Robin Söderling in the opening round of the main draw.

A doubles specialist, Hemmes and partner Dennis van Scheppingen paired together to reach quarter-finals at the 2003 Ordina Open and 2004 Dutch Open.

Challenger titles

Doubles: (6)

References

1981 births
Living people
Dutch male tennis players
Sportspeople from Tilburg
20th-century Dutch people
21st-century Dutch people